Field Marshal Sir William Robert Robertson, 1st Baronet,  (29 January 1860 – 12 February 1933) was a British Army officer who served as Chief of the Imperial General Staff (CIGS) – the professional head of the British Army – from 1916 to 1918 during the First World War. As CIGS he was committed to a Western Front strategy focusing on Germany and was against what he saw as peripheral operations on other fronts. While CIGS, Robertson had increasingly poor relations with David Lloyd George, Secretary of State for War and then Prime Minister, and threatened resignation at Lloyd George's attempt to subordinate the British forces to the French Commander-in-Chief, Robert Nivelle. In 1917 Robertson supported the continuation of the Battle of Passchendaele (also known as the Third Battle of Ypres) at odds with Lloyd George's view that Britain's war effort ought to be focused on the other theatres until the arrival of sufficient US troops on the Western Front.

Robertson is the only soldier in the history of the British Army to have risen from an enlisted rank to its highest rank of field marshal.

Early life
Robertson was born in Welbourn, Lincolnshire, the son of Thomas Charles Robertson, a tailor and postmaster of Scottish ancestry, and Ann Dexter Robertson (née Beet). He was educated at the local church school and as an older child earned 6d a week as a pupil-teacher. After leaving school in 1873, he became a garden boy in the village rectory, then in 1875 he became a footman in the Countess of Cardigan's household at Deene Park. He made no mention of this period in his life in his autobiography and seldom spoke of it, although during the First World War he is once said to have remarked to one of his aides, "Boy – I was a damn bad footman."

He began his military career in November 1877 by enlisting for twelve years as a trooper in the 16th (The Queen's) Lancers. As he was three months short of the official minimum age of eighteen, at the behest of the recruiting sergeant he declared his age as eighteen years and two months, these extra five months becoming his "official" age throughout his time in the Army.

His mother wrote to him in horror: "... what cause have you for such a low life ...?" "You know you are the Great Hope of the Family...if you do not like Service you can do something else...there are plenty of things Steady Young Men can do when they can write and read as you can...(the Army) is a refuge for all idle people...I shall name it to no one for I am ashamed to think of it...I would rather bury you than see you in a red coat." On his first night in the Army, he was so horrified by the rowdiness of the barrack room that he contemplated deserting, only to find that his civilian clothes, which had been parcelled up but not yet sent home, had already been stolen by another deserter.

As a young soldier, Robertson was noted for his prowess at running and for his voracious reading of military history. He won company first prizes for sword, lance and shooting. Among the young lieutenants under whom he served were future Lieutenant-General "Jimmy" Babington and "Freddy" Blair, who would later be Robertson's Military Secretary at Eastern Command in 1918. He was promoted to lance-corporal in February 1879 and corporal in April 1879. As a corporal, he was imprisoned for three weeks with his head shaven when a soldier under arrest, whom he was escorting, escaped near Waterloo Station. Later, whilst serving in Ireland, he once kept soldiers under arrest handcuffed for a twelve-hour train journey rather than risk a repetition of the event.

He was promoted to lance-sergeant in May 1881 and sergeant in January 1882. He obtained a first class certificate of education in 1883, while serving in Ireland. Robertson was promoted to troop sergeant major in March 1885 to fill a vacancy, as his predecessor, a former medical student serving in the ranks, had been demoted for making a botch of the regimental accounts and later committed suicide.

Junior officer
Encouraged by his officers, and the clergyman of his old parish, he passed an examination for an officer's commission and was posted as a second lieutenant in the 3rd Dragoon Guards on 27 June 1888. Normally only four or five rankers were commissioned each year at that time. 
Robertson later recorded that it would have been impossible to live as a cavalry subaltern in Britain, where £300 a year was needed in addition to the £120 official salary (approximately £30,000 and £12,000 at 2010 prices) to keep up the required lifestyle; he was reluctant to leave the cavalry, but his regiment was deployed to India, where pay was higher and expenses lower than in the UK. Robertson's father made his uniforms and he economised by drinking water with meals and not smoking, as pipes were not permitted in the mess and he could not afford the cigars which officers were expected to smoke. Robertson supplemented his income by studying with native tutors while others slept during the hot afternoons, qualifying as an interpreter—for which officers received cash grants—in Urdu, Hindi, Persian, Pashto and Punjabi.

Promoted to lieutenant on 1 March 1891, he saw his first active service in 1891, distinguishing himself as Railway Transport Officer for the expedition to Kohat. He was appointed an attaché in the Intelligence Branch of the Quartermaster-General's Department at Simla in India on 5 June 1892. There he became a protégé of Sir Henry Brackenbury, the new Military Member of the Viceroy's Council (equivalent to War Minister for India), who had been Director of Military Intelligence in London and was keen to beef up the intelligence branch of the Indian army, including mapping the Northwest Frontier. Robertson spent a year writing a long and detailed "Gazetteer and Military Report on Afghanistan". After five years in India he was granted his first long leave in 1893, only to find that his mother had died before he reached home.

In June 1894 he undertook a three-month journey via Gilgit and mountainous north Kashmir, crossing the Darkot Pass at over 15,000 feet to reach the Pamirs Plateau at the foot of the Himalayas, returning to India in August by a westerly route via Chilas and Khagan. On the journey he learned Gurkhali from a Gurkha, later qualifying in this, his sixth Indian language.

He was promoted to captain on 3 April 1895. He took part in the Chitral Expedition as Brigade Intelligence Officer to the force which marched through the Malakand Pass, across the Swat River, via Dir to Chitral. He was described by Lieutenant-General Sir Robert Low, the Expedition Commander, as a "very active and intelligent officer of exceptional promise". After the relief of Chitral and installation of Shuja-ul-Mulk as Mehtar, Robertson was engaged in pacification and reconnaissance duties, but was wounded when attacked by his two guides on a narrow mountain path during a reconnaissance. One guide was armed with a shotgun and fired at Robertson but missed. The other guide attacked him with Robertson's own sword (which he had been carrying, as Robertson had dysentery) but Robertson punched him to the ground then drove off both attackers with his revolver; one was wounded and later captured and executed. The incident was reported and illustrated in the Daily Graphic and Robertson was awarded the DSO, which was, he later recorded, "then a rather rare decoration".

Staff College
Robertson then applied to attend Staff College at Camberley. Unlike most applicants, he could not afford to take extended leave from his job (on the intelligence staff at Simla) to attend a crammer, and had he failed he would have been too old to apply again, so he rose between 4 and 5 am each day to study mathematics, German, and French with the assistance of his wife. He later qualified as an interpreter in French. He just missed a place, but was given a nominated place on the recommendation of Sir George White (Commander-in-Chief, India). In 1897, accompanied by his wife and baby son, he became the first former ranker to go there.

Under George Henderson he absorbed the principles, derived from Jomini, Clausewitz, and Edward Hamley's Operations of War (1866), of concentration of physical and moral force and the destruction of the main enemy army. He passed out second from Staff College in December 1898 and was then seconded for service in the Intelligence Department at the War Office on 1 April 1899. As a staff captain he was the junior of two officers in the Colonial (later renamed Imperial) section.

Boer War and War Office
With the start of the Second Boer War, Robertson was appointed as Deputy Assistant Adjutant-General to Frederick Roberts, 1st Earl Roberts, the British Commander-in-Chief South Africa, on 15 January 1900. He was present at the Battle of Paardeberg (17–26 February 1900), the Battle of Poplar Grove (7 March 1900) and other battles in March and May. Robertson was promoted to major on 10 March 1900 and was mentioned in despatches on 2 April 1901.

He returned to the War Office in October 1900 and on 29 November 1900 was promoted brevet lieutenant-colonel for his services in South Africa. On 1 October 1901 he was appointed Assistant Quartermaster-General with specific responsibility for the Foreign Military Intelligence section, on the recommendation of the Intelligence expert General Sir Henry Brackenbury, and worked closely with William Nicholson (then Director of Military Operations). Although Robertson was later to be a staunch advocate of Britain's concentration of effort on the Western Front, in March 1902 (before the Entente Cordiale) he wrote a paper ("Treaty Obligations of the British Empire") recommending that, in the event of Belgian neutrality being violated by France or Germany in any future war, Britain should concentrate on naval warfare and deploy no more troops to Belgium than was needed to "afford ocular proof of our share in the war." His suggestion did not meet with approval at the highest political level: Foreign Secretary Lord Lansdowne commented that British policy had always been to deploy a small force immediately and (as had been done in the Boer War) a corps as soon as mobilisation was complete, whilst Lord Salisbury, then in his final months as Prime Minister, commented that he disapproved of such "meditations".

Robertson was promoted to brevet colonel on 29 November 1903. Having been one of the oldest lieutenants in the army, he was now one of the youngest colonels, heading a staff of nine officers (divided into Imperial, Foreign and Special sections). In the later words of a contemporary, Robertson "became rated as a superman, and only key appointments were considered good enough for him."

Robertson was made Assistant Director of Military Operations under James Grierson and appointed a Companion of the Order of the Bath (CB) on 30 June 1905. In spring 1905, during the First Moroccan Crisis, Grierson and Robertson conducted a war game based on a German march through Belgium, Robertson commanding the German forces. They were persuaded that early and strong British intervention – it was assumed that British forces would land at Antwerp – was necessary to slow the German advance and avoid French defeat. In 1906 they toured the Charleroi-to-Namur area with the French liaison officer Victor Huguet. In 1906 Robertson also toured the Balkans, where he was impressed by the size of the mountains, a factor which was later to influence his scepticism about the Salonika front during the First World War.

When that job expired in January 1907, Robertson, without a post, was placed on so-called half-pay. In fact, his salary dropped from £800 to £300, causing him severe financial difficulty; he earned money by translating German and Austro-Hungarian military manuals into English, again assisted by his wife. He became Assistant Quartermaster-General at Headquarters Aldershot Command on 21 May 1907 and then brigadier general (equivalent to the modern rank of brigadier) on the General Staff at Headquarters Aldershot Command on 29 November 1907. He had hoped for command of a brigade. In 1909 he reconnoitred the likely route of a German invasion – Belgium, the Meuse and Luxembourg – with Smith-Dorrien and Rawlinson.

Commandant, Staff College

During Brigadier General (later Field Marshal Sir) Henry Wilson's tenure as Commandant at Staff College, Camberley (1906–10), Robertson lectured on Belgium, the Canadian frontier and the Balkans.

Robertson's patron Nicholson, now Chief of the Imperial General Staff, appointed him Commandant at Staff College, effective 1 August 1910. However, Nicholson had initially (according to Wilson) opposed Robertson "because of want of breeding", while Wilson also opposed Robertson's appointment, perhaps feeling that Robertson's lack of private means did not suit him for a position which required entertaining. Robertson thought the Camberley job "greatly underpaid". He wrote to his friend Godley of a "pestilential circle" in top appointments which left "no chance for the ordinary man" and that the combination of Wilson as Director of Military Operations at the War Office (a job which Robertson may well have coveted for himself), Ewart as Adjutant-General and Stopford as Commandant of the Royal Military College, Sandhurst, was "enough to make one sick". On 28 July 1910, shortly before taking up his new position, Robertson visited Camberley with Kitchener, who criticised Wilson. Relations between Wilson and Robertson deteriorated thereafter, beginning a rivalry which was to feature throughout the Great War.

Robertson was a practical lecturer at Camberley whose teaching included withdrawals as well as advances. Edmonds, who had been Robertson's classmate in the 1890s, said he was a better lecturer than even Henderson. He taught officers that they "were at the Staff College to learn Staff Duties and to qualify for Staff Captain, not to talk irresponsible trash" about "subjects of policy or strategy". These and a number of similar recollections, written up after the Great War, may exaggerate the differences in style between Robertson and Wilson.

He was appointed a Commander of the Royal Victorian Order on 16 July 1910 and promoted to major-general on 26 December 1910. He was advanced to Knight Commander of the Royal Victorian Order on 26 September 1913; on being knighted he mistakenly rose and shook the King's proffered hand instead of kissing it as required by protocol. The King was privately amused and the two men soon formed a good relationship. He was appointed Director of Military Training at the War Office on 9 October 1913.

Early in 1914, at an exercise at Staff College, Robertson, acted as Exercise Director, while Wilson acted as chief of staff. Edmonds later wrote that he said to French in a stage whisper "if you go to war with that operations staff, you are as good as beaten." Had war not broken out, French had promised him command of 1st Division at Aldershot in the summer of 1914, in succession to Samuel Lomax.

Curragh incident
With the Cabinet apparently contemplating some kind of military action against the Ulster Volunteers, it was unclear whether the Director of Military Operations (responsible for operations abroad), the Adjutant-General (responsible for domestic aid to the civil power) or the Director of Military Training (DMT, responsible for home defence) was responsible for drawing up deployment plans. On the evening of 18 March, Robertson, who had asked practical questions throughout, was told that it was his responsibility as DMT.

After Hubert Gough and other officers had threatened to resign in the Curragh incident, Robertson also supported Wilson in trying in vain to persuade French (CIGS) to warn the government that the Army would not move against Ulster. The affair led to hatred between senior officers and Liberal politicians. Robertson contemplated resigning, but unlike French or Wilson he emerged without any blot on his reputation.

First World War: 1914–15

Quartermaster General, BEF

Robertson was expected to remain Director of Military Training on the outbreak of the First World War, or to become chief staff officer to the Home Defence Forces. Instead he replaced Murray (who was promoted to be BEF Chief of Staff) as Quartermaster General of the British Expeditionary Force (under Field Marshal French) from 5 August 1914.

Robertson was concerned that the BEF was concentrating too far forward, and discussed a potential retreat with Major-General Robb, Inspector-General of Lines of Communication, as early as 22 August (the day before the Battle of Mons) when French and Wilson were still talking of advancing. He arranged supply dumps and contingency plans to draw supply from the Atlantic rather than the Belgian coast, all of which proved invaluable during the retreat from Mons. He became known as "Old Any-Complaints?" as this was his usual question when checking on troops at mealtimes. In Dan Todman's view, the excellent performance of BEF logistics in August 1914 contrasted favourably with the "almost farcical" performance of the BEF General Staff.

Robertson "felt deeply" the loss of his close friend Colonel Freddy Kerr, who was killed by a shell while serving as GSO1 (chief of staff) to 2nd Division.

Robertson was then promoted (over the head of Wilson who was already Sub Chief of Staff) to Chief of Staff (CGS) of the BEF from 25 January 1915. Robertson had told Wilson (17 January) that he did not want the promotion as he "could not manage Johnnie, who was sure to come to grief and carry him along with him". (Wilson commented in his diary on the irony of both of the candidates for the job – they were in a car driving to church together at the time – protesting to one another that they did not want it.) Robertson later wrote that he had hesitated to accept the job, despite the higher pay and position, as he knew he was not French's first choice, but had put his duty first. He refused to have Wilson remain as Sub Chief. French was soon impressed by Robertson's "sense and soundness" as CGS. Wilson continued to advise French closely whereas Robertson took his meals in a separate mess. Robertson preferred this, and in common with many other senior BEF officers his relations with French deteriorated badly in 1915.

Chief of Staff, BEF
Robertson improved the functioning of the staff at GHQ by separating Staff Duties and Intelligence out from Operations into separate sections, each headed by a Brigadier-General reporting to himself (previously, the Operations section had been something of a bottleneck, exacerbated by a personality clash between Murray and Harper).

Robertson was advanced to Knight Commander of the Order of the Bath on 18 February 1915.

Robertson consistently urged strong commitment to the Western Front. He advised on 22 February that Balkan countries would act in their own interests, not those of Britain, and thought the naval attempt to force the Dardanelles "a ridiculous farce". He also advised French on 2 April 1915 that if the government did not make France the main theatre of operations they should stand on the defensive there.

Robertson told Hankey on 1 June that Sir John French was "always wanting to do reckless and impossible things" and made similar remarks to Kitchener in July. When French visited London on 23 June to talk to Kitchener, Robertson remained behind as he could not be seen to argue with French in public. He advised on 25 June 1915 against retreat to the Channel Ports, an option contemplated by the Cabinet after the defensive losses at Second Ypres, arguing that it would leave the British "helpless spectators" in France's defeat, and on 26 June, in response to a Churchill memorandum, that attacks on entrenched positions at Gallipoli had been just as costly as on the Western Front, but without the chance of defeating the German army. In "Notes on the Machinery of the Government for the Conduct of the War" on 30 June 1915 he argued, in Clausewitzian terms, that the government should state its war aims, in this case, the liberation of Belgium and the destruction of German militarism, and then let the professionals achieve them.

The King had a "long talk" with Robertson on 1 July and was left convinced that French should be removed as Commander-in-Chief of the BEF. Attending a council of war in London in early July 1915, Robertson was asked at the end if he had any comments—he produced a map and delivered a 45-minute lecture, and when interrupted stood glaring at the minister. His presentation made a strong impression compared to the indecisiveness of the politicians and Kitchener.

Robertson wrote to Kiggell (20 June 1915) that "these Germans are dug in up to the neck, or concreted" in "one vast fortress" ... "attack on a narrow front & we are enfiladed at once" ... "attack on wide front is impossible because of insufficient ammunition to bombard and break down the defences". Tactically, he urged "slow attrition, by a slow and gradual advance on our part, each step being prepared by a predominant artillery fire and great expenditure of ammunition" and stressed the importance of counterbattery work. He also (July 1915) advocated surprise, and realistic objectives to prevent attacking infantry outrunning their artillery cover and ragged lines becoming vulnerable to German counterattack. Maurice, who drafted many of Robertson's memos, had advised him (19 June 1915) that such attacks were best carried out in places where the Germans were, for political or strategic reasons, reluctant to retreat so were bound to take heavy losses. Robertson initially opposed the mooted Loos offensive, recommending (20 July) a more limited attack by Second Army to seize Messines-Wyndeschete ridge, and telling Sidney Clive (25 July) it would be "throwing away thousands of lives in knocking our heads against a brick wall". He tried to get Sir John "in a better state of mind & not so ridiculously optimistic about a state of German collapse", although he told a conference in July that he and Sir John French "looked out above all things for optimists".

Robertson also advised (5 August) that Russia, then being driven out of Poland, might make peace without a wholehearted British commitment.

Robertson complained to Wilson (29 July) that French "chopped & changed every day & was quite hopeless" and (12 August) was "very sick with Sir J., he cannot manage him nor influence him"; Wilson noted that relations between French and Robertson were breaking down, and suspected (correctly) that Robertson was blackening French's reputation by sending home documents which French had refused to read or sign. He wrote a memo to French (3 or 5 August) arguing that the volunteer New Armies should be committed to the Western Front, an idea to which Kitchener was only reluctantly coming round. French refused to read it, explaining that he was "fully acquainted with the situation", so Robertson sent it to the King's adviser Wigram anyway.

Robertson was made a Grand Officer of the French Legion of Honour on 10 September 1915 and acted as Commander-in-Chief BEF when French was sick in September.

Promotion to CIGS

Robertson later wrote in his memoirs that he was not close to Kitchener, having only ever served with him in South Africa. With Asquith's Coalition Government in danger of breaking up over conscription (which Robertson supported), he blamed Kitchener for the excessive influence which civilians like Churchill and Haldane had come to exert over strategy, allowing ad hoc campaigns to develop in Sinai, Mesopotamia and Salonika, and not asking the General Staff (whose chief James Wolfe-Murray was intimidated by Kitchener) to study the feasibility of any of these campaigns. Robertson had urged the King's adviser Stamfordham (probably June or July 1915) that a stronger General Staff was needed in London, otherwise "disaster" would ensue. By October 1915 Robertson had come to support greater coordination of plans with the French and was in increasingly close touch with Charles Callwell, who had been recalled from retirement to become Director of Military Operations.

When the King toured the front (24 October) Haig told him that Robertson should go home and become CIGS, while Robertson told the King (27 October 1915) that Haig should replace French. He was promoted to permanent lieutenant general on 28 October 1915. Robertson clinched his claim as the future CIGS with a lengthy paper (actually written by Maurice, dated 8 November) "The Conduct of the War", arguing that all British efforts must be directed at the defeat of Germany. Robertson told Haig from London (15 November 1915), where he was seeing the King and Kitchener, "the first thing is to get you in command".
French, finally forced to "resign" early in December 1915, recommended Robertson as his successor and Kitchener told Esher (4 December) that the government intended to appoint Robertson Commander-in-Chief, although to Esher's disappointment "dear old R" was not appointed. Robertson was willing to relinquish his claim if the job went to Haig, his senior and a front line commander since the start of the war. Conversely, Haig's inarticulacy may also have made him an unappealing choice as CIGS.

Kitchener and Asquith were agreed that Robertson should become CIGS, but Robertson refused to do this if Kitchener "continued to be his own CIGS", although given Kitchener's great prestige he wanted him not to resign but to be sidelined to an advisory role like the Prussian War Minister. Asquith asked the men to negotiate an agreement, which they did over the exchange of several draft documents at the Hotel de Crillon in Paris. Kitchener agreed that Robertson alone should present strategic advice to the Cabinet, with Kitchener responsible for recruiting and supplying the Army, and that the Secretary of State should sign orders jointly with the CIGS (Robertson had demanded that orders go out over his signature alone). Robertson became Chief of the Imperial General Staff on 23 December 1915, with an Order in Council formalising Kitchener and Robertson's relative positions in January 1916.

Initial decisions
Robertson assumed his duties on 23 December 1915. He brought with him three able men from GHQ: Whigham (Robertson's Deputy), Maurice (Operations) and MacDonogh (Intelligence). Their replacements, especially Kiggell (the new CGS BEF), and Charteris (BEF Intelligence) were much less able than their predecessors, a fact which probably affected BEF performance over the next two years.

Although Robertson's advice to abandon the Salonika bridgehead had been overruled at the Allied Chantilly Conference (6–8 December 1915), his first act as CIGS was to insist on the evacuation of the Cape Helles bridgehead, which the Royal Navy had wanted to retain as a base and which some (e.g. Balfour, Hankey) had wanted to retain for the sake of British prestige in the Middle East (abandonment of the other Gallipoli bridgehead at Suvla/Anzac, too narrow to defend against enemy artillery, had already been decided on 7 December).

On his first day as CIGS Robertson also demanded a defensive policy in Mesopotamia, with reinforcements drawn only from India – this was agreed on 29 February 1916, over the objections of Balfour and Lloyd George. Robertson also insisted that Mesopotamian operations (and eventually logistics as well) be brought under his control rather than that of the India Office. Townshend, besieged in Kut, was not initially thought to be in danger, but eventually surrendered in April 1916 after three failed relief attempts.

Another early act as CIGS (27 December 1915) was to press Kitchener for an extra 18 divisions for the BEF. Conscription of bachelors – for which Robertson lobbied – was enacted in early 1916.

CIGS: 1916

Strategic debates
Robertson was a strong supporter of BEF commander Douglas Haig and was committed to a Western Front strategy focusing on Germany and was against what he saw as peripheral operations on other fronts.

Having seen politicians like Lloyd George and Churchill run rings around Kitchener, Robertson's policy was to present his professional advice and keep on repeating it, flatly refusing to enter into debate, arguing that the government should accept his advice or else find another adviser. However, Robertson reduced the government's freedom of action by cultivating the press, much of which argued that the professional leadership of Haig and Robertson was preferable to civilian interference which had led to disasters like Gallipoli and Kut. He was particularly close to H. A. Gwynne and Charles Repington, who worked for the Northcliffe Press until it ceased to support the generals late in 1917, and advised Haig to cultivate journalists also. Robertson communicated by secret letters and "R" telegrams to generals in the field, including Milne, whom he discouraged from offensive operations at Salonika, and Maude who may have "consciously or unconsciously" ignored his secret orders from Robertson not to attempt to take Baghdad.

In a 12 February 1916 paper Robertson urged that the Allies offer a separate peace to Turkey, or else offer Turkish territory to Bulgaria to encourage Bulgaria to make peace. In reply, Grey pointed out that Britain needed her continental allies more than they needed her, and Britain could not, e.g. by reneging on the promise that Russia could have Constantinople, risk them making a compromise peace which left Germany stronger on the continent.

Robertson told the War Committee (22 February 1916) that the French desire to transfer more troops to Salonika showed a weakening in their resolve for trench warfare. He scorned the idea that it would bring Greece into the war on the Allied side, and at a late March 1916 conference argued with Briand (French Prime Minister) and Joffre, who thumped the table and shouted that Robertson was "un homme terrible".

With characteristic bluntness he said of an Italian officer (12 March 1916), who warned that his country might be invaded by Switzerland, "I'd like to have kicked him in the stomach".

The War Committee had only agreed (28 December 1915) with some reluctance to make preparations for the Western Front Offensive agreed at Chantilly, which Haig and Joffre agreed (14 February) should be on the Somme, although Robertson and the War Committee were not pleased at Joffre's suggestion that the British engage in "wearing out" attacks prior to the main offensive. For three months, against a backdrop of Russia planning to attack earlier than agreed, Italy reluctant to attack at all and the scaling-down of the planned French commitment because of Battle of Verdun, Robertson continued to urge the politicians to agree to the offensive. He increasingly believed that France was becoming exhausted and that Britain would carry an ever greater burden. After Robertson promised that Haig "would not make a fool of himself" (he told Repington that Haig was "a shrewd Scot who would not do anything rash"), the War Committee finally agreed (7 April).

Robertson lobbied hard with politicians and the press for the extension of conscription. When the Cabinet finally authorised the Somme Offensive, Robertson had the Army Council make a statement in favour of conscripting married men. In the face of protests from Bonar Law that the government might break up, to be followed by a General Election (which he thought would be divisive, even though the Conservatives would probably win) and conscription brought in by martial law, Robertson refused to compromise and encouraged Dawson, editor of The Times, to make his stance public. After poor relations between French and Kitchener had permitted civilian interference in strategy, Robertson was also determined to stand solid with Haig, telling him (26 April 1916) that they finally had the civilians "into a corner & have the upper hand".

Prelude to the Somme

Robertson was contemptuous of the House Grey Memorandum (early 1916) and of President Woodrow Wilson's offer to mediate in May 1916. Robertson and Hankey were sent from the room on 24 May 1916 so the politicians could discuss the offer, and McKenna (Exchequer) later told Hankey that he, Asquith, Grey and Balfour, but not Bonar Law or Lloyd George, had been in favour of accepting because of "the black financial outlook". The plan was stopped when the entire Army Council, including Kitchener and Robertson, threatened to resign.

At first Robertson tried to limit information to the War Committee only to a summary of news, most of which had already appeared in the newspapers – this was stopped by Hankey (who called it "really almost an insult to the intelligence of the War Committee") and Lloyd George (22 April – 3 May 1916) when it was discovered that Robertson had moved troops from Egypt and Britain to France with little reference to the War Committee. (Given the logistical difficulties, Robertson scoffed at suggestions that the Turks might invade Egypt, and by July, on his orders, Murray had shipped out 240,000 of the 300,000 British Empire troops in Egypt, including nine infantry divisions, three independent infantry brigades and nine heavy artillery batteries, most of them going to France, leaving him with four Territorial divisions and some mounted troops.) In late May Haig and Robertson also angered ministers by challenging their right to inquire into the shipping of animal fodder to France.

Robertson told ministers (30 May, after a 28 May letter from Haig) that "Haig had no idea of any attempt to break through the German lines. It would only be a move to (rescue) the French", although he was probably not aware of Haig's insistence, overruling Rawlinson's earlier plan, on bombarding deeper into the German defences in the hope of breaking through and "fighting the enemy in the open".

Robertson was promoted to permanent general on 3 June 1916.

At an Anglo-French conference at 10 Downing Street (9 June) Robertson finally succeeded in blocking a major offensive from Salonika. In response to French pleas that such an attack might bring Romania into the war, Lloyd George continued to lobby throughout July and August. Robertson's view was that the Germans would prefer the Allies to keep large numbers of troops at Salonika, that Romania would come in as a result of Russian success, if any, and that peace with Bulgaria, although desirable to cut German-Turkish communications, was best sought by diplomatic means.

Robertson lobbied hard – briefing against him to Stamfordham and The Times and The Morning Post – but in vain to prevent Lloyd George, who made no secret of his desire to use his control over military appointments to influence strategy, succeeding Kitchener as Secretary of State for War. Although Robertson retained the special powers he had been granted in December 1915, and Lord Derby, an ally of the soldiers, was appointed Under-Secretary, Robertson still wrote to Kiggell (26 June 1916) "That d----d fellow L.G. is coming here I fear. I shall have an awful time."

The Somme
Robertson had been clear that it would take more than one battle (28 December 1915, 1 January 1916) to defeat Germany, but like many British generals he overestimated the chances of success on the Somme, noting that Britain had more ammunition and big guns than before, that by attacking on a wide front of 20 miles or so, the attackers would not be subjected to enfilade German artillery fire (in the event this probably spread the artillery too thin, contributing to the disaster of 1 July) and that attrition would work in the Allies' favour as "the Germans are approaching the limit of their resources".

Robertson's assistant Frederick Maurice had written (29 June) that Haig "does not mean to knock his head against a brick wall, and if he finds he is only making a bulge and meeting with heavy opposition he means to stop and consolidate and try somewhere else". Robertson wrote to Haig on 5 July that he had no idea what Haig planned to do next, and he appears still to have expected Haig to switch BEF efforts to an offensive in Flanders later in the summer, an idea with which Haig had previously been toying.

Robertson also wrote to Kiggell (Chief of Staff BEF) (5 July) stressing that "the road to success lies through deliberation" and that "nothing is to be gained but very much is to be lost by trying to push on too rapidly". He recommended "concentration and not dispersion of artillery fire" and "the thing is to advance along a wide front, step by step to very limited and moderate objectives, and to forbid going beyond those objectives until all have been reached by the troops engaged", and urging Kiggell "not to show this letter to anyone". In the same letter he wrote: "Before the war our theory was that anybody who could make ground should make it. This is a dangerous theory until we get through the enemy’s trenches".

Kiggell replied to the CIGS on the evening of 14 July. He conceded that there had been problems with infantry-artillery coordination, but seemed more concerned with the slowness of progress, anticipating that the commanders might be criticised by future Staff College lecturers for not pushing on fast enough, but insisting that "the Bosch was badly rattled on a good part of our front". Possibly (in David Woodward’s view) worried at Kiggell’s response, Robertson wrote to Rawlinson, GOC Fourth Army, on 26 July urging him not to let the Germans "beat you in having the better man-power policy" and urging "common-sense, careful methods, and not to be too hide-bound by the books we used to study before the war". In the same letter he wrote that "[Field Service Regulations] will require a tremendous amount of revising when we have finished with the Boche" and urged him not to take the principles of FSR too literally, adding "I think you know what is in my mind", a phrase which Tim Travers believes refers to Robertson's preference for more cautious tactics.

Henry Wilson recorded rumours that Robertson was angling for Haig's job in July, although there is no clear evidence that this was so. This was the month with the highest British casualties of the entire war, at a time when the German Verdun Offensive was already being scaled back. Haig was reluctant to send Robertson full weekly reports and Robertson complained that Haig's daily telegrams to him contained little more information than the daily press releases. "Not exactly the letter of a CIGS! … He ought to take responsibility also!" was Haig's comment on one such letter (29 July). F. E. Smith (1 August) circulated a paper by his friend Winston Churchill (then out of office), criticising the high losses and negligible gains of the Somme. Churchill argued that this would leave Germany freer to win victories elsewhere. Robertson issued a strong rebuttal the same day, arguing that Britain's losses were small compared to what France had suffered in previous years, that Germany had had to quadruple the number of her divisions on the Somme sector and that this had taken pressure off Verdun and contributed to the success of Russian and Italian offensives.

After the Churchill memorandum Robertson wrote to Haig (1 August 1916) accusing the War Committee (a Cabinet committee which discussed strategy in 1916) of being "ignorant" and putting too much emphasis on "gaining ground" rather than putting "pressure" on the Germans; Travers argues that he was "cunning(ly)” using the War Committee as "a stalking horse" and obliquely urging Haig to adopt more cautious tactics. Both Robertson and Esher wrote to Haig reminding him of how Robertson was covering Haig's back in London, Robertson reminding Haig of the need to give him "the necessary data with which to reply to the swines" (7 and 8 August).

Robertson was initially unimpressed by the appointment (20 August) of Hindenburg as German Chief of Staff, and he knew little about Ludendorff.

Robertson thought the use of the new tanks at the Battle of Flers–Courcelette "rather a desperate innovation" and appears to have had little faith in decisive victory at that battle (letter to Haig 29 August).

With Allied offensives apparently making progress on all fronts in August, Robertson hoped that Germany might sue for peace at any time and urged the government to pay more attention to drawing up war aims, lest Britain get a raw deal in the face of collusion between France and Russia, whom Robertson also regarded as long-term threats to Britain (as indeed they had been until the early 1900s). Prompted by Asquith, Robertson submitted a memorandum on war aims (31 August). He wanted Germany preserved as a major power as a block to Russian influence, possibly gaining Austria to compensate for the loss of her colonies, Alsace-Lorraine and her North Sea and Baltic ports (including the Kiel Canal).

Clash with Lloyd George
Robertson correctly guessed that the Bulgarian declaration of war on Romania (1 September) indicated that they had been promised German aid. While Lloyd George, who wanted Greece to be brought into the war on the Allied side, if necessary by a naval bombardment, was visiting the Western Front Robertson persuaded the War Committee (12 September) that Romania was best helped by renewed attacks on the Somme.

Robertson had told Monro, the new Commander-in-Chief India, to "keep up a good show" (1 August 1916) in Mesopotamia but wanted to retreat from Kut to Amara rather than make any further attempt to take Baghdad, but this was overruled by Curzon and Chamberlain on the War Committee, which authorised Maude to attack (18 September 1916).

Lloyd George criticised Haig to Foch on a visit to the Western Front in September, and proposed sending Robertson on a mission to persuade Russia to make the maximum possible effort. With Royal backing, and despite Lloyd George offering to go himself, Robertson refused to go, later writing to Haig that it had been an excuse for Lloyd George to "become top dog" and "have his wicked way". Lloyd George continued to demand, in the teeth of Robertson's objections, that aid be sent to help Romania, eventually demanding (9 October) that 8 British divisions be sent to Salonika. This was logistically impossible, but to Robertson's anger the War Committee instructed him to consult Joffre. Derby dissuaded him from resigning the next day, but instead he wrote a long letter to Lloyd George (11 October) complaining that Lloyd George was offering strategic advice contrary to his own and seeking the advice of a foreign general, and threatening to resign if his advice was not followed. That same day Northcliffe stormed into Lloyd George's office to threaten him (he was unavailable) and the Secretary of State also received a warning letter from Gwynne, who had earlier been highly critical of his interview with Foch. Lloyd George had to give his "word of honour" to Asquith that he had complete confidence in Haig and Robertson and thought them irreplaceable. However, he wrote to Robertson wanting to know how their differences had been leaked to the press (although he affected to believe that Robertson had not personally "authorised such a breach of confidence & discipline") and asserting his right to express his opinions about strategy. The Army Council went on record forbidding unauthorised press contacts, although that did nothing to stop War Office leaks.

The Somme ends
At the inter-Allied conference at Boulogne (20 October) Asquith supported Robertson in opposing major offensives at Salonika, although Britain had to agree to send a second British division, rather than be the only Ally not to send reinforcements. Robertson wrote to Repington (31 October 1916) "If I were not in my present position I daresay I could find half a dozen different ways of rapidly winning this war. Being in the position I am and knowing what I know I find it not so easy...". 
He advised Hankey (31 October 1916) that further high casualties would be needed to defeat Germany's reserves.

The War Committee met (3 November 1916) without Robertson, so Lloyd George could, in Hankey's words "air his views freely unhampered by the presence of that old dragon Robertson". He complained that the Allies had not achieved any definite success, that the Germans had recovered the initiative, had conquered most of Romania, had increased her forces in the East (after increased mobilisation the German Army had increased in size from 169 ½ divisions on 1 June to 197 divisions (of which 70 were in the East, up from 47 ½ on 1 June)) and still had 4 million men in reserve. On this occasion Asquith backed him and the committee's conclusion, which was neither printed nor circulated, was that "The offensive on the Somme, if continued next year, was not likely to lead to decisive results, and that the losses might make too heavy a drain on our resources having regard to the results to be anticipated." It was agreed to consider offensives in other theatres. The ministers again (7 November) discussed, after Robertson had left the room, the plan to send Robertson to a conference in Russia (all except possibly McKenna were in favour) and a further inter-Allied conference to upstage the forthcoming conference of generals at Chantilly. Robertson rejected the idea as "the Kitchener dodge" and was angry at the discussion behind his back and, concerned that Lloyd George wanted to "play hanky panky", refused to go.

Robertson wanted industrial conscription, national service for men up the age of 55, and 900,000 new army recruits, similar to the new German Hindenburg Programme. He was concerned at the Asquith Coalition's lack of firm leadership, once likening the Cabinet to "a committee of lunatics", and although he avoided taking sides in party politics he urged the creation of a small War Committee which would simply give orders to the departmental ministers, and was concerned (letter to Hankey, 9 November) that ministers might be tempted to make peace or else to reduce Britain's Western Front commitment. Robertson gave an abusive response to the Lansdowne Memorandum (13 November 1916) (calling those who wanted to make peace "cranks, cowards and philosophers … miserable members of society").

Robertson successfully lobbied Joffre and at the Chantilly Conference (15–16 November 1916) Joffre and Robertson (in Haig's view) "crushed" Lloyd George's proposal to send greater resources to Salonika.

The Somme ended on 18 November. There was already divergence between MacDonogh and Charteris as to the likelihood of German collapse. Robertson had written to Kiggell again (29 September) urging him not to raise expectations too high, and Robertson shocked ministers by forecasting that the war would not end until summer 1918, which proved a broadly accurate forecast. The War Office reported in November and December that the French had suffered much more favourable loss ratios than the British on the Somme, although they attributed better French artillery skills to the French artillery having only increased 2.5 times in size since the start of the war, whereas the British had increased tenfold.

On 21 November, after a discussion about manpower, Asquith again met ministers without Robertson present, and they agreed they could not order him to go to Russia. His influence was already beginning to wane. In the event departure, originally scheduled for November, was delayed until January and Wilson was sent in Robertson's place.

At the second Chantilly Conference it had been agreed that Britain would in future take a greater share of the war on the Western Front. Asquith had written to Robertson (21 November 1916) of the War Committee's unanimous approval of the desirability of capturing or rendering inoperable the submarine and destroyer bases at Ostend and Zeebrugge. Haig and Robertson had obtained Joffre's approval for a British Flanders Offensive, after wearing-out attacks by Britain and France.

Lloyd George becomes prime minister
During the December political crisis Robertson advised Lloyd George to "stick to it" and form a three-man War Council, which would probably include the Foreign Secretary but not the First Lord of the Admiralty or the Secretary of State for War. He was suspected of briefing the press against Asquith, and had to assure the Palace that this was not so, and there is no evidence that he did. Had he not ousted Asquith, Lloyd George had planned to appeal to the country, his Military Secretary Colonel Arthur Lee having prepared a memo blaming Robertson and the General Staff for the loss of Serbia and Romania. Robertson warned the first meeting of the new 5-man War Cabinet (9 December) against the danger of "sideshows". By contrast Hankey (8 December), although he thought Western Front offensives inevitable, advised sending aid to Italy and offensives in Palestine – Lloyd George filed this with the Cabinet papers and used it as the blueprint of future strategy discussions.

With Murray's support, in the autumn of 1916 Robertson had resisted attempts to send as many as 4,000 men to Rabegh to help the nascent Arab Revolt, stressing that logistical support would bring the total up to 16,000 men, enough to prevent Murray's advance on El Arish. Robertson accused the ministers (8 December 1916) of "attaching as much importance to a few scallywags in Arabia as I imagine they did to the German attack on Ypres two years ago", but for the first time ministers contemplated overruling him. Encouraged by hope that the Russians might advance to Mosul, removing any Turkish threat to Mesopotamia, Robertson authorised Maude to attack in December 1916.

Robertson advised against accepting Germany's offer (12 December 1916) of a negotiated peace.

During renewed talk of sending more troops to Salonika, Robertson was told not to attend a meeting on 23 December 1916.

CIGS: Spring 1917

January conferences
Robertson was appointed Aide-de-Camp General to the King on 15 January 1917 and was advanced to Knight Grand Cross of the Order of the Bath on 24 January 1917.

Following a fractious Anglo-French conference in London (26–8 December) the War Cabinet (30 December) gave Lloyd George authority to "conclude any arrangement" at the forthcoming Rome conference. On the train to the Rome Conference Robertson formed a low opinion of the new French War Minister, Hubert Lyautey, correctly predicting that he would not last long in his job.

At the Rome Conference (5–6 January 1917) Lloyd George, advised by Hankey, proposed sending heavy guns to Italy with a view to defeating Austria-Hungary, possibly to be balanced by a transfer of Italian troops to Salonika. Robertson stressed that this was contrary to agreed policy and hinted that he might resign. Cadorna (Hankey suspected he had been "got at by Robertson") stressed the logistical difficulty of accepting the heavy guns, even when Lloyd George removed the precondition that they be returned to the Western Front by May, and even Albert Thomas (French Minister of Munitions) thought it unwise to remove the guns from the Western Front. Robertson wrote to Lloyd George explicitly threatening to resign if he acted on Briand's impassioned plea to send more divisions to Salonika.

A further Conference followed in London (15–16 January 1917). Cadorna was also once again talking of being able to win a major victory if reinforced by 300 heavy guns or 8 British divisions – Robertson predictably opposed this (29 January).

Calais
Haig wanted to delay his attack until May to coincide with Italian and Russian attacks, but was told by the government to take over French line as requested, to live up to both the "letter" and "spirit" of the agreement with the new French Commander-in-Chief Nivelle, to be ready no later than 1 April, and not cause delays, almost certainly a result of private lobbying by Nivelle. Robertson was worried about Nivelle forcing the British to attack before the ground dried, although when Haig blamed the poor state of the railways (he demanded twice the railway requirements for half as many troops as the French), he inquired (28 January) whether Haig's staff had obtained an exaggerated figure by simply adding together the highest estimate of every subordinate formation. Haig demanded a meeting between British and French ministers to resolve matters, although Robertson urged him (14 February) to resolve them in a face-to-face meeting with Nivelle and keep the politicians out of it.

Robertson later claimed that he attended the Calais Conference thinking it would be solely about railways, but this is probably untrue. Robertson was at the War Cabinet (20 February) – he told them that Haig and Nivelle were in complete agreement – which insisted on a conference to draw up a formal agreement about "the operations of 1917", and Robertson wrote to Haig (24 February) informing him of this.

Neither Robertson nor Derby were invited to the War Cabinet on 24 February (no minutes were circulated, but on the train to Calais Hankey was instructed to draw up a summary to be circulated after the conference), at which ministers felt that the French generals and staff had shown themselves to be more skilful than the British, while politically Britain had to give wholehearted support to what would probably be the last major French effort of the war. Hankey also told Stamfordham that on the train to Calais Lloyd George had informed Robertson and Maurice that he had the authority of the War Cabinet "to decide specifically between Generals Haig & Nivelle", although the subordination of Haig to Nivelle had not been specifically discussed.

At Calais (26–7 February), after the railway experts had been sent away, at Lloyd George's request Nivelle produced rules governing the relations between the British and French armies, to be binding also on their successors. Nivelle was to exercise, through British staff at GQG, operational command (including control of logistics and food) of British forces, with Haig left in control only of discipline (which could not legally be placed in foreign hands) and forbidden to make direct contact with London. Haig, Spears later wrote, "had become a cipher, and (his) units were to be dispersed at the will of the French command, like the Senegalese Regiments, like the Moroccans, like the Foreign Legion, until (his) massed thousands had become mere khaki pawns scattered among the sky-blue pawns"

The plans were brought to Robertson, who feeling unwell had dined with Maurice in his room, at around 9pm. In Spears' famous account Robertson's face "went the colour of mahogany … his eyebrows slanted outwards like a forest of bayonets held at the charge – in fact he showed every sign of having a fit" He shouted "Get 'Aig!". Haig and Robertson visited Lloyd George – one of Robertson's objections was that the agreement could not be binding on Dominion troops – who told them that he had the authority of the War Cabinet and that, although Nivelle's demands were "excessive", they must have a scheme agreed by 8am. The next morning, after Nivelle had claimed he had not personally drawn up the scheme and professed astonishment that the British generals had not already been told of it, Robertson "ramped up and down the room, talking about the horrible idea of putting "the wonderful army" under a Frenchman, swearing he would never serve under one, nor his son either, and that no-one could order him to". Hankey drew up a compromise rather than see Haig and Robertson resign, with Haig still under Nivelle's orders but with tactical control of British forces and right of appeal to the War Cabinet. Robertson later (3 March) regretted even agreeing to this.

Eroding the agreement
Robertson wrote to Haig (28 February) that Lloyd George was "an awful liar" for claiming that the French had originated the proposal (the Prime Minister had in fact met Major Berthier de Sauvigny (15 February), a French liaison officer in London, telling him that Haig needed to be subordinated to Nivelle for the offensive and that if necessary he would be replaced), and that he lacked the "honesty & truth" to remain Prime Minister. Haig claimed (3 March) that with the BEF spread more thinly by having recently taken over line to the south, German forces (they had recently added 300 battalions by more intensive mobilisation, and by withdrawing to the Hindenburg Line would later free up an extra 15–20 divisions (135 -180 battalions)) might be used to attack at Ypres and cut him off from the Channel Ports. The French assumed Haig was inventing this threat (possibly true – in the summer of 1917 Haig's staff confessed to MacDonogh of playing up such a threat to avoid cooperating with the French).

Robertson, who had been sick in bed, wrote to Haig (3 March) that he did not trust Nivelle. He continued to lobby the War Cabinet ("it was very unpleasant to listen to" wrote Spears) of the folly of leaving the British Army under French control, passing on Haig's demand that he keep control of the British reserves, and advising that intelligence reports suggested preparations for large-scale German troop movements in Eastern Belgium. With War Cabinet opinion having turned against Lloyd George – who was also rebuked by the King – Robertson also then submitted a memorandum stating that the Calais Agreement was not to be a permanent arrangement, along with a "personal statement" so critical of Lloyd George that he refused to have it included in the minutes.

The King and Esher also urged Haig and Robertson to come to an agreement with the government.

At another conference in London (12–13 March) Lloyd George expressed the government's full support for Haig and stressed that the BEF must not be "mixed up with the French Army", and Haig and Nivelle met with Robertson and Lyautey to settle their differences. The status quo ante, by which British forces were allies rather than subordinates of the French, but Haig was expected to defer to French wishes as far as possible, was essentially restored.

Nivelle Offensive

Robertson later came out to Beauvais in March 1917 to demand that Wilson keep him fully informed of all developments. On a visit to the Italian Front in March 1917 Robertson was unimpressed by the "white faces and white hands" of many Italian officers, which suggested that they spent too much time at headquarters and not enough time visiting the front lines.

Robertson was sceptical of suggestions that Russia's war effort would be reinvigorated by the Fall of the Tsar, and recommended that Britain keep up the pressure on Germany by attacking on the Western Front. He thought the USA, which had declared war on Germany, would do little to help win the war. Even if President Wilson sent troops to Europe which was by no means certain, it would take until summer 1918 for 250,000 US troops to be available. Robertson prepared another General Staff appraisal (28 March 1917) stressing how the Allied position had deteriorated since the previous summer, and again recommending diplomatic efforts to detach Germany's allies, although he chose not to circulate it to the civilians. Germany had freed an extra 1.7m men for military service, and by the summer of 1917 the German Army would be an extra 1.25m men stronger, an extra 89 divisions (albeit reduced from 12 infantry battalions to 9).

The day after the Nivelle Offensive began, Robertson circulated another paper (17 April) warning that Nivelle would be sacked if he failed – which is indeed what happened – and urging the end of the Calais Agreement.

Robertson was awarded the French Croix de Guerre on 21 April 1917 and appointed a Knight Grand Cross of the Order of Saints Maurice and Lazarus on 26 May 1917.

Other fronts: Spring 1917
Lloyd George wanted to make the destruction of Turkey a major British war aim, and two days after taking office told Robertson that he wanted a major victory, preferably the capture of Jerusalem, to impress British public opinion. Robertson thought the capture of Beersheba should suffice as more divisions were needed to allow Haig to take over more line in France, although he told Murray (31 January 1917) he wanted him to launch a Palestine Offensive, to sustain public morale, in autumn and winter 1917, if the war was still going on then.

A January 1917 paper, probably drafted by Macdonogh, argued that, with a compromise peace leaving Germany in control of the Balkans increasingly likely, Britain should protect her Empire by capturing Aleppo, which would make Turkey's hold on Palestine and Mesopotamia untenable. Aleppo could be more easily reached from Palestine than from Mesopotamia, provided Murray had 9–10 infantry divisions, and it was argued that the Turks would have problems assembling 100,000 men to defend it. This paper was much more optimistic than Robertson's later views, but at this stage Russia was still pinning down many Turkish troops. When consulted, the Admiralty were less enthused about suggestions that the Royal Navy assist with amphibious landings in Palestine. Except for this one "very secret" memorandum (sent to ministers 22 February 1917) Robertson tried to keep all his discussions of plans against the Turks verbal. It was agreed to build up Murray's forces to 6 infantry divisions and 2 mounted divisions by the autumn, as well 16 Imperial Camel Companies and possibly some Indian cavalry from France.

With Maude having taken Baghdad (11 March 1917), the Turks having withdrawn from Persia and Medina loosely besieged by the Arabs, and Murray having made an apparently successful attack at Gaza (26 March), Robertson asked the War Cabinet (30 March) for permission to order Murray to renew his offensive. Initial reports turned out to have been exaggerated, and a subsequent attack (17–19 April 1917) also failed. This coincided with the failure of the Nivelle Offensive, reports of unrest among Russian troops after the February Revolution and an escalation of the U-Boat War (it was thought that loss of shipping might make Egypt untenable) causing Robertson to prefer a return to a defensive policy in the Middle East.

CIGS: Summer 1917

Robertson's views on Flanders
As Chief of Staff BEF Robertson had had Maurice, then Director of Military Operations at GHQ, prepare a study of an Ypres Offensive on 15 March 1915. The study had warned that the capture of Ostend and Zeebrugge "would be a very difficult enterprise so far as the nature of the country is concerned" and if successful "would not materially improve the military situation of the Allies in the western theatre" except in the unlikely event that it prompted a general German withdrawal – more likely it would leave the British defending a longer line supplied by only two lines of railway, at "a grave disadvantage" and "in a rather dangerous position" with their backs to the sea as the Germans counterattacked.

By 1917 Robertson was more keen on the idea of the Germans standing and fighting where they would suffer at the hands of strong British artillery. He wrote to Haig (20 April) cautioning against "determination to push on regardless of loss" and repeating Nivelle's error of trying too much to "break the enemy's front" and urged him instead to concentrate on "inflicting heavier losses on (the enemy) than one suffers oneself". It is unclear that the letter had much effect as Haig appointed Gough, an aggressive cavalryman, to command the Ypres Offensive shortly after receiving it.

France steps back
With the Nivelle Offensive in its final stages, Lloyd George went to the Paris Summit authorised by the 1 May 1917 War Cabinet to "press the French to continue the offensive". Lloyd George was keen to build bridges with the generals and told them at Paris (3 May 1917) that he would back their plans ("We must go on hitting and hitting with all our strength") and stressed that they must choose the time and place of the next offensive. The next day Robertson stressed attrition with limited territorial objectives, while Hankey stressed the importance of Zeebrugge, where the Germans would suffer attrition if they stood and fought. Over dinner the Prime Minister reduced the company to "fits of laughter" with an impersonation of Robertson. Robertson thought Paris "about the best Conference we have had". With Russian commitment to the war wavering, Smuts, Milner and Curzon agreed with Robertson that Britain must attack in the west lest France or Italy be tempted to make a separate peace.

Petain, committed to only limited attacks, became French Commander-in-Chief (15 May) and with Esher warning that the French government would not honour their Paris commitments, Robertson warned Haig that the British government would not take kindly to high casualties if Britain had to attack without wholehearted French support. Foch, now French chief of staff, also urged Robertson at a meeting (7 June 1917) to conduct only limited attacks (he opposed the planned Flanders Offensive) until the Americans sent more troops, and they discussed the possibility of attacks on Austria-Hungary designed to encourage her to make peace.

Robertson and Haig met (9 June) after the victory at Messines. Robertson warned Haig that the government were diverting manpower into shipbuilding, ship crews and agriculture rather than the Army, and that a prolonged offensive would leave Britain "without an Army" by the autumn, and suggested that attacks against Austria-Hungary might be more prudent. Haig, dismayed, retorted that "Great Britain must … win the war by herself" and that the government were "failing at the XIIth hour". Haig also showed Robertson his "Present Situation and Future Plans" (dated 12 June) in which he argued that he had a good chance of clearing the Belgian Coast provided the Germans were unable to transfer reinforcements from the Eastern Front (in the event German reinforcements did not start to arrive in number until November), and that victory at Ypres "might quite possibly lead to (German) collapse". Robertson told Haig he disagreed with the statistical appendix (prepared by Charteris who was thought "a dangerous fool" in the War Office) showing German manpower near breaking point and refused to show it to the War Cabinet.

War Policy Committee
The political consensus of May had broken down. Lloyd George told the War Cabinet (8 June) he was dissatisfied with military advice so far and was setting up a War Policy Committee (himself, Curzon, Milner and Smuts) which held 16 meetings over the next six weeks. Smuts, newly appointed to the Imperial War Cabinet, recommended renewed western front attacks and a policy of attrition. He privately thought Robertson "good but much too narrow & not adaptable enough".

Robertson objected to proposals to move 300 heavy guns and 12 divisions to Italy, secretly lobbying Foch, via Spears, in late June 1917. He also warned that the Germans could transfer forces to Italy easily, an attack on Trieste might leave Allied forces vulnerable to counterattack from the north, that Cadorna and his army were not competent, and conversely that they might even make peace if they succeeded in capturing Trieste.

Robertson wrote to Haig (13 June) that "there is trouble in the land just now". He complained to him of the War Policy Committee's practice of interviewing key people individually to "get at facts" rather than simply setting policy and allowing Robertson and Jellicoe to decide on the military means, and that there would be "trouble" when they interviewed himself and Haig. He wrote that "the (guns) will never go (to Italy) while I am CIGS". He also urged him not to promise, on his forthcoming visit to London, that he could win the war that year but simply to say that his Flanders plan was the best plan, which Robertson agreed it was, so that the politicians would not "dare" overrule both men.

Haig told the War Policy Committee (19 June, and contrary to Robertson's advice of six days earlier) that "Germany was nearer her end than they seemed to think … Germany was within six months of the total exhaustion of her available manpower, if the fighting continues at its present intensity" and (20 June) he had no "intention of entering into a tremendous offensive involving heavy losses" while Robertson wanted to avoid "disproportionate loss" (23 June). At this time Haig was involved in discussions as to whether Robertson should be appointed First Lord of the Admiralty (a ministerial post), and Woodward suggests that he may have felt that Robertson had outlived his usefulness as CIGS. Ministers were not entirely convinced by Jellicoe's warnings about German submarines and destroyers operating from the Belgian ports, but were influenced by France's decline (the opposite to Robertson's original view that this made a major offensive less sensible) and by the apparent success of the Kerensky Offensive. The Flanders Offensive was finally sanctioned by the War Policy Committee on 18 July and the War Cabinet two days later, on condition that it did not degenerate into a long-drawn out fight like the Somme.

To Haig's annoyance the War Cabinet had promised to monitor progress and casualties and, if necessary call a halt. Robertson arrived in France (22 July) to be handed a note from Kiggell, urging that the offensive continue to keep France from dropping out (even if Russia or Italy did). Over dinner Haig urged Robertson to "be firmer and play the man; and, if need be, resign" rather than submit to political interference and on his return Robertson wrote to Haig to assure him that he would always advise "supporting wholeheartedly a plan which has once been approved". Robertson met with Cadorna and Foch (24 July) prior to another inter-Allied conference at Paris, and they agreed that the current simultaneous offensives must take priority over Allied reinforcements for Italy, even though it was now clear that the Kerensky Offensive was failing disastrously and that Germany might sooner or later be able to redeploy divisions to the west.

Middle East: New commander
Curzon (12 May 1917) and Hankey (20 May) continued to urge that Britain seize land in the Middle East. Allenby, Murray's replacement, had been told by Lloyd George that his objective was "Jerusalem before Christmas" and that he had only to ask for reinforcements, but Robertson warned him that he must take into account the needs of other fronts for men and shipping. Allenby's exact remit was still undecided when he was appointed.

Allenby arrived on 27 June 1917. Robertson (31 July) wanted him to keep active so as to prevent the Turks concentrating forces in Mesopotamia, although he scoffed at intelligence reports that the Germans might send as many as 160,000 men to that theatre. Allenby was eventually ordered to attack the Turks in southern Palestine, but the extent of his advance was not yet to be decided, advice which Robertson repeated in "secret and personal" notes (1 and 10 August).

CIGS: Third Ypres

Third Ypres begins
Third Ypres, also known as the Battle of Passchendaele, began on 31 July, with Haig claiming that German losses were double those of the British. Robertson asked Kiggell (2 August) for more information to share with ministers.

After the Inter-Allied conference in London (6–8 August 1917), at which Lloyd George had urged the creation of a common Allied General Staff, Robertson again joined with Foch in claiming that there was not time to send heavy guns to Italy for a September offensive. Robertson wrote to Haig (9 August) that Lloyd George would "put up (the useless) Foch against me as he did Nivelle against you in the Spring. He is a real bad 'un." Haig, at the urging of Whigham (Deputy CIGS), wrote to Robertson (13 August) congratulating him at the way he had "supported the sound policy" in London, but complaining that Macdonogh's "pessimistic estimates" of German losses might cause "many in authority to take a pessimistic outlook" whereas "a contrary view, based on equally good information (sic), would go far to help the nation on to victory".

With the offensive already bogged down in unseasonably early wet weather, French (14 August 1917) claimed to Riddell (managing director of the News of the World, and likely to pass on French's views to Lloyd George) that Robertson was "anxious to get the whole of the military power into his own hands, that he is a capable organiser but not a great soldier, and we are suffering from a lack of military genius". Lloyd George suggested that all Robertson's plans be submitted to a committee of French, Wilson and one other, although Wilson thought this "ridiculous and unworkable".

Robertson wrote to Haig (17 August) warning him of the shortage of manpower, and to "scrape up all the men (he could) in France". He also warned Haig that there were at that time less than 8,000 "A1" soldiers at home, and that Home Forces were largely made up of "boys" of eighteen whom Robertson, having a son only a few years older, thought too young for service in France. Haig had to tell his Army Commanders that the BEF would be 100,000 men under establishment by October.

The Eleventh Battle of the Isonzo began (18 August) and on 26 August, the British Ambassador in Rome advised that there might be "a complete smashing" of the Austro-Hungarian Army. Robertson advised that it was "false strategy" to call off Third Ypres to send reinforcements to Italy, but after being summoned to George Riddell's home in Sussex, where he was served apple pudding (his favourite dish), agreed to send a message promising support to Cadorna, but only on condition Cadorna promised decisive victory. The Anglo-French leadership agreed in early September to send 100 heavy guns to Italy, 50 of them from the French Army on Haig's left, rather than the 300 which Lloyd George wanted.

Robertson expressed his concern (15 September) that the heavy shelling necessary to break enemy defences at Ypres was destroying the ground.

As soon as the guns reached Italy, Cadorna called off his offensive (21 September).

Third Ypres: reluctance to call a halt
Robertson felt that Lloyd George's proposal for an Anglo-French landing at Alexandretta would use up too much shipping and told the War Policy Committee (24 September) that he felt Allenby had enough resources to take Jerusalem, although he stressed the logistical difficulties of advancing 400 miles to Aleppo.

Bonar Law, having guessed from a recent talk with Robertson that he had little hope "of anything coming of" Third Ypres, wrote to Lloyd George that ministers must soon decide whether or not the offensive was to continue. Lloyd George travelled to Boulogne (25 September) where he broached with Painlevé the setting up of an Allied Supreme War Council and then making Foch generalissimo. On 26 September Lloyd George and Robertson met Haig to discuss the recent German peace feelers, one of which suggested she might give up her colonies, Belgium, Serbia and Alsace-Lorraine in return for keeping Poland and the Baltic States. Ministers were reluctant to accept this, but at the same time were concerned that Britain could not defeat Germany singlehandedly (in the event the peace feelers were publicly repudiated by Chancellor Michaelis, and Robertson again urged diplomatic efforts to encourage Bulgaria and Turkey to make peace, although the collapse of Russia made this less likely).

Haig preferred to continue the offensive, encouraged by Plumer's recent successful attacks in dry weather at Menin Road (20 September) and Polygon Wood (26 September), and stating that the Germans were "very worn out". Robertson spoke to the Army Commanders, but declined Haig's offer that he do so without Haig present. He later regretted not having done so, although he was aware of the ill-feeling which Painlevé had caused when he asked Nivelle's subordinates to criticise him. He later wrote in his memoirs that "I was not prepared to carry my doubts to the point of opposing (Haig)" or of preventing one more push which might have "convert(ed) an inconclusive battle into a decisive victory".

On his return Robertson wrote Haig an equivocal letter (27 September) stating that he stuck to his advice to concentrate effort on the Western Front rather than Palestine out of instinct and lack of any alternative than from any convincing argument. He also wrote that "Germany may be much nearer the end of her staying power than available evidence shows" but that given French and Italian weakness it was "not an easy business to see through the problem".

Robertson's refusal to advise a halt to Third Ypres cost him the support of Smuts and Milner. By the end of the year the Cabinet Committee on Manpower were hearing about an alarming rise in drunkenness, desertions and psychological disorders in the BEF, and reports of soldiers' returning from the front grumbling about "the waste of life" at Ypres, and even Haig himself writing (15 Dec, while arguing against a proposal that the BEF take over line from the French) that many of his divisions were "much exhausted and much reduced in strength".

Palestine manpower requirements
At the War Policy Committee (3 October) in Robertson's absence, Lloyd George urged greater effort to advance into Syria with a view to knocking Turkey out of the war altogether, and the ministers decided to redeploy 2 divisions from France. Robertson angered the Prime Minister (5 October) by arguing against this, claiming that these troops would be needed in France. He also asked Allenby to state his extra troop requirements to advance from the Gaza–Beersheba line (30 miles wide) to the Jaffa–Jerusalem line (50 miles wide), urging him to take no chances in estimating the threat of a German-reinforced threat (although neither Allenby nor Robertson really thought there was much chance of this happening), but urging Maude not to exaggerate his needs in Mesopotamia.

Robertson, worried that he would be overruled as Painlevé was visiting London for talks, without waiting for Allenby's reply, claimed (9 October) that 5 divisions would need to be redeployed from France to reach the Jaffa-Jerusalem line, and that Allenby would face at least 16 Turkish divisions (120,000 men). That same day Allenby's own estimate arrived, claiming that he would need 13 extra divisions (an impossible demand even if Haig's forces went on the defensive) and that he might face 18 Turkish and 2 German divisions. Yet in private letters Allenby and Robertson agreed that sufficient British Empire troops were already in place to take and hold Jerusalem. In the event the Germans sent only 3 battalions to Palestine, and Turkish strength there was only 21,000 (out of 110,000 on all fronts) facing 100,000 British Empire troops. The politicians were particularly irritated that they were being shown clearly exaggerated estimates at a time when the General Staff were demanding renewed effort to "divert (Germany's) strategic reserve" to Flanders.

In his 8 October paper, Haig claimed that since 1 April 1917, 135 of the 147 German divisions on the Western Front had been driven from their positions or withdrawn after suffering losses, several of them two or three times, and argued that the Allies could beat Germany in 1918 even if Russia were to make peace. The War Cabinet was sceptical, and in his reply (9 October) Robertson, although he thought Haig's memo "splendid", cautioned that German Army morale still seemed to be holding up well. He wrote to Haig in the same letter that "the Palestine thing will not come off", and having heard from Lord Robert Cecil that Haig was dissatisfied with him, asked him to "let me do my own job in my own way" in standing up for proper principles of warfare against Lloyd George. He also commented that (Lloyd George) was "out for my blood very much these days" and claimed that "Milner, Carson, Cecil, Curzon and Balfour, have each in turn expressly spoken to me separately about his intolerable conduct", that he hoped "matters would come to a head" at the next Cabinet as he was "sick of this d–d life", that he would "manage" Lloyd George, and that Painleve's recent visit to London had been an attempt to "carry him off his feet" but that he "had big feet!".

Robertson also (9 October) advised against the Prime Minister's recent talk of setting up a Supreme War Council, reminding ministers of the Nivelle fiasco and the sending of heavy guns to Italy only for Cadorna to call off his offensive, and wanted Britain to dominate operations in 1918 by virtue of the strength of her army and her political stability.

Politicians seek other advice
The War Cabinet (11 October 1917) invited Wilson and French to submit formal written advice, a blatant undermining of Robertson's position. Dining with Wilson and French the night before, Lloyd George claimed that Robertson was "afraid of Haig, & that both of them are pigheaded, stupid & narrow visioned". Wilson and French urged no major war-winning offensive until 1919. Robertson thought the War Cabinet a "weak kneed craven hearted Cabinet ... Lloyd George hypnotises them and is allowed to run riot". Derby had to remind them that Robertson was still their constitutional adviser, and Haig was too busy to come to a planned showdown to which Lloyd George invited him and Robertson. Haig advised Robertson not to resign until his advice had actually been rejected.

As advised by Wilson and Viscount French, Lloyd George persuaded the War Cabinet and the French to agree to a Supreme War Council. Hankey (20 October) suspected that the plan of an inter-allied staff of generals in Paris would alone be enough to drive Robertson to resignation. Wilson was appointed British Permanent Military Representative after it had been offered to Robertson (which would have meant giving up his CIGS job). Robertson later claimed in his memoirs that he supported the SWC as a political body, but not the military advisers providing separate advice from the national general staffs.

CIGS: 1917–18

Rapallo and Paris
The argument was overtaken by disaster on the Italian front: the Battle of Caporetto began on 24 October. Robertson later wrote to Edmonds in 1932 that although he had kept the diversion of divisions to Italy to a minimum, some reinforcements had to be sent as the Italians would not have been impressed by claims that they were best helped by renewed British attacks in Flanders.

Robertson went to Italy to supervise deployment of British divisions, meeting Lloyd George, Hankey and Wilson when they arrived for the Rapallo Conference (6–7 November), which formally established the Supreme War Council. Robertson had been told by Hankey that Lloyd George had the War Cabinet's backing, and Lloyd George (Memoirs ii 440-1) later wrote of Robertson's "general sulkiness" and "sullen and unhelpful" attitude at the conference. He walked out of the meeting, telling Hankey "I wash my hands of this business", and contemplated resignation, as he had over the French-Wilson papers.

Lloyd George and Robertson had long been briefing the press (mainly the Morning Post in Robertson's case) against one another. After Lloyd George's Paris speech (12 November), in which he said that "when he saw the appalling casualty lists" he "wish(ed) it had not been necessary to win so many ("victories")", and unlike the Nivelle Affair, Lloyd George's differences with the generals were being aired in public for the first time. The Daily News, Star and Globe attacked Lloyd George.

Robertson reported to the War Cabinet (14 November) that Italy's situation was like that of Russia in 1915 and that she might not recover. In his paper "Future Military Policy" (19 November), Robertson was impressed by the French Army's recovery under Petain but advised that lack of French reserves might make major French offensives in 1918 unlikely. He rejected a purely defensive posture in the west, as even defending would still result in heavy casualties, but was sceptical of Haig's wish to renew the Ypres Offensive in Spring 1918, and argued that Britain should build up her strength on the Western Front and then decide on the scale of her 1918 offensives. He warned (correctly) that, with Russia dropping out of the war, the Germans would use the opportunity to attack in 1918 before the American Expeditionary Force were present in strength. Lloyd George replied (wrongly) that the Germans would not attack and would fail if they did.

Amid talk of Austen Chamberlain withdrawing support from the government, Robertson briefed the Opposition Leader Asquith. However, Lloyd George survived the Commons debate on Rapallo (19 November) by praising the generals and claiming that the aim of the Supreme War Council was purely to "coordinate" policy.

SWC and Inter-Allied Reserve

Derby got the Prime Minister to agree that Robertson should accompany Wilson (British Military Representative) to all Supreme War Council meetings and he would make no proposals until Robertson and the War Council had had a chance to vet them. He then reneged on this promise, telling Derby (26 November) that Robertson would have a chance to comment at the meeting itself and that decisions would have to ratified by the War Cabinet after they had been made. Lloyd George restored Wilson's freedom of action by instructing Wilson to send his reports directly to him.

Hankey wrote (26 November) that only Britain, the USA and Germany were likely to last until 1919 and that "on the whole the balance of advantage lies with us, provided we do not exhaust ourselves prematurely".

By the time of the initial SWC meeting (Versailles 1 December 1917) Allenby's successes, culminating in the Fall of Jerusalem (9 December 1917), demonstrated the potential of attacks in the Middle East, particularly compared to Haig's apparently unproductive offensive at Ypres, followed by Cambrai in November (initial success followed by retaking of gains). Russia had finally collapsed (Brest Litovsk Armistice 16 December) yet only a handful of American divisions were available so far in the west.

After the Fall of Jerusalem Derby threatened to resign if Lloyd George sacked Robertson, but the War Cabinet (11–12 December) minuted its dissatisfaction at the information which he had given them about Palestine. Maurice claimed that intelligence from Syria "was too stale to be of use" and Robertson claimed that the speed of Allenby's advance, often with little water, had taken everyone by surprise.

After the Fall of Jerusalem, Allenby irritated Robertson by writing that he could conquer the rest of Palestine with his present force of 6–8 divisions, but said he would need 16–18 divisions for a further advance of 250 miles to Aleppo (the Damascus-Beirut Line) to cut Turkish communications to Mesopotamia. In a paper of 26 December, Robertson claimed that the conquest of the remainder of Palestine might mean an extra 57,000 battle casualties and 20,000 sick. Amery (30 December) thought this "an amazing document even from him" and that such arguments could have been produced against any major campaign in history. By mid-January Amery and Lloyd George were arranging for the Permanent Military Representatives at Versailles to discuss Palestine (they thought Turkish ration strength was 250,000 "at most" whereas the General Staff put it at 425,000, of whom around half were combatants).

Robertson tried to control Lt Gen Sir William Raine Marshall (Maude's replacement as C-in-C Mesopotamia) by handpicking his staff. Smuts was sent to Egypt to confer with Allenby and Marshall and prepare for major efforts in that theatre. Before his departure, alienated by Robertson's cooking of the figures, he urged Robertson's removal. Allenby told Smuts of Robertson's private instructions (sent by hand of Walter Kirke, appointed by Robertson as Smuts' adviser) that there was no merit in any further advance and worked with Smuts to draw up plans for further advances in Palestine.

Wilson wanted Robertson reduced "from the position of a Master to that of a servant". Robertson thought Wilson's SWC Joint Note 12, which predicted that neither side could win a decisive victory on the Western Front in 1918, and that decisive results could be had against Turkey, "d-----d rot in general" and promised Haig he would "stick to (his) guns and clear out if (he was) overruled". Joint Note 12 and Note 14 proposing the formation of a General Reserve were discussed at the second full session of the SWC (30 January – 2 February 1918): Robertson opposed attacks on Turkey, (1 Feb) siding openly with Clemenceau against Lloyd George. Although Robertson apologised for doing so, the Prime Minister was angry and told Wilson afterwards that he would have to get rid of Robertson. Robertson's request to be on the Executive Board controlling the planned Allied General Reserve was overruled.

Robertson called the Executive War Board the "Versailles Soviet" and claimed to the King's adviser Lord Stamfordham that having "practically, two CIGSs" would lead to "destruction of confidence among the troops". He also briefed Gwynne against the proposals, writing that "the little man" was "all out for (his) blood" and "to see that the fine British Army is not placed at the mercy of irresponsible people – & some of them foreigners at that".

Fall from power
Robertson was finally forced out in February 1918 over his refusal to agree that the British representative at the Supreme War Council at Versailles should be Deputy CIGS and a member of the Army Council (giving him the right to issue orders to the BEF). He distrusted the dual chain of command set up by the War Cabinet, and he wanted civilians to stay out of military decision-making. Lloyd George offered Robertson a choice of remaining as CIGS in London with reduced powers (reporting to the Secretary of State for War rather than directly to the War Cabinet), or else accepting the Versailles job. Robertson's position was that either the CIGS should himself be the Versailles delegate or else the Versailles representative should be clearly subordinate to the CIGS. There was talk of the government falling, and Lloyd George attempted to have Robertson swap jobs with Plumer, then commanding British troops in Italy (Plumer refused).

Haig was summoned to London to be consulted; while driving from Victoria Station to 10 Downing Street "by a circuitous route" Derby, who had threatened to resign in protest, told him (9 Feb) Robertson "had lately become most difficult to deal with and lost his temper quickly". Haig, whose relations with Robertson had been deteriorating since at least the Boulogne Conference of September 1917, told Robertson (11 Feb) it was his duty to go to Versailles or anywhere else the government wanted, and advised the King to insist on Robertson going to Versailles. Derby (in Beaverbrook's phrase "left stranded like a whale on a sandbank") withdrew his resignation, which Lloyd George permitted on condition he did not resign again.

Four days of argument, 11 February 1918 through to 14 February 1918, now ensued between Robertson and the War Cabinet. The King thought it would be "a national calamity" if Robertson was removed but when told of this Lloyd George told Stamfordham that "he did not share the King's extremely favourable opinion" of Robertson "who had never fought at the Front, had hardly ever visited the trenches, and who was not known by the rank and file" and that the government would resign if the King attempted to block Robertson's removal. Curzon and Balfour were sympathetic to Robertson's position that the Versailles delegate must report to the CIGS, but he lost Balfour's sympathy at a Cabinet meeting on 14 February where he made clear his dislike of Wilson. He had told Stamfordham that he would serve at Versailles under Plumer as CIGS, but not under Wilson "his Junior".

As part of Lloyd George's power struggle with Robertson and his press supporters, on 16 February the prominent journalists Gwynne and Repington appeared at Bow Street Magistrates' Court charged with having contravened DORA Regulation 18 by printing articles discussing the conflict between Versailles and the War Office, Lloyd George's plans to concentrate efforts against Turkey, and the failure to keep the Army up to strength. Robertson's wife was in the crowd, as were his colleagues Macdonogh and Maurice. Repington later claimed that Robertson had told him that he could no more afford to be seen with him than either of them "could afford to be seen walking down Regent Street with a whore".

After a fortnight of argument Robertson's "resignation" was announced. Lloyd George, possibly aware that Robertson was dependent on his army pay, suggested he be given command of an Army in France, but Haig said he "was quite unfitted to command troops". Robertson wrote notes thanking Maurice, Macdonogh and Whigham, ending "now get on with the war". Wilson and Robertson had a very brief handover meeting at the War Office, at which Robertson (by Wilson's account) was "grumpy and ungracious & said he had nothing to say – and indeed said nothing". Wilson later recalled (in his last letter as CIGS, to Rawlinson (13 February 1922)) that he "walked out without handing me over anything in particular; there was indeed a box of matches in the top right-hand drawer and some feathers for pipe-cleaning, or the remains of some of the Staff".

After CIGS: the Maurice Affair
Robertson was appointed General Officer Commanding-in-Chief of Eastern Command in February 1918. He would hold this post for four months.

After the German "Michael" Offensive, the press (8–9 April) blamed Lloyd George for starving the army of men, with the Morning Post and Daily News mentioning that it happened just after Robertson's removal while the Star called for Robertson to be appointed Secretary of State for War. The Star later blamed the Versailles machinery for forcing a depleted Fifth Army to take over more front, while the Globe and Morning Post called for Robertson's restoration as CIGS. Lloyd George was amenable to Haig's suggestion that Robertson be appointed Deputy Commander-in-Chief of the BEF, but Robertson wrote to Haig (19 April) "my job is CIGS or nothing". Repington in the Morning Post (20 and 22 April) called this suggestion "a pretext for getting him out of the way of the imbeciles" in London and called for Lloyd George's removal as Prime Minister.

On 29 April Robertson met with his former assistant Maj-Gen Maurice to discuss concerns, which Maurice had heard being discussed at Haig's GHQ on 15 April, that Lloyd George had misled the House of Commons on 9 April about the weakness of the BEF prior to the German "Michael" Offensive. From the context (letters from Robertson 29 and 30 April) it is clear that Robertson suggested that he write to Henry Wilson and then, if necessary to the press. Robertson initially suggested he speak to Asquith, Leader of the Opposition, but Maurice did not do so (in John Grigg's view Asquith probably would have advised against going to the press), and Robertson changed his mind later the same day. Maurice composed his letter on 2 May but did not yet send it. Robertson wrote to him on 4 May, writing that not too much credence should be given to imminent predictions of Lloyd George's downfall, that Maurice should take especial care to get his facts exactly right, and adding: "You are contemplating a great thing – to your undying credit".

The Maurice letter, a blatant breach of King's Regulations, appeared in several newspapers on 7 May. Maurice denied that it was a military conspiracy to overthrow a civilian government, and claimed "it ha(d) been seen by no soldier" (omitting to mention that Robertson had praised and encouraged him). Lloyd George later claimed in his memoirs that Robertson had been aiming to topple the government and become a military dictator like Hindenburg, claims which were believed by Beaverbrook. However, although journalists like Gwynne and Maxse sometimes dropped such hints, there is no evidence that this was Robertson's intention. Robertson thought Lloyd George would survive the crisis, although he may have hoped to be restored as CIGS.

Hankey recorded (8 May) rumours, seemingly being repeated by Lloyd George, that Robertson was plotting with Asquith, Trenchard (recently resigned as Chief of Air Staff), Repington, Gwynne, Maurice and Jellicoe (recently sacked as First Sea Lord), although the rumours also said that Robertson refused to openly associate with the Maurice Letter. Robertson wrote to Lord Milner (Secretary of State for War) denying that he had been involved in such conspiracies. Lloyd George survived the Maurice Debate (9 May).

Robertson was promoted to General Officer Commanding-in-Chief for Home Forces in June 1918. He visited each regional command, and took a special interest in the air defence of London, correctly predicting that the bombing of civilians would play an ever greater role in future wars.

Haig had gradually established a warily respectful relationship with Wilson, with whom he was on first-name terms, which he never had been with Robertson. (A letter to Haig on 16 February 1918, shortly before his resignation, is the only known occasion on which Robertson addressed Haig by his first name.) After the war Haig paid tribute at a dinner to Wilson, but not to Robertson, who was present. Robertson left remarking he would "never go farting with 'Aig again".

Post-war

Robertson became Commander-in-Chief of the British Army of the Rhine in April 1919. It was at a tennis-party at his house in Cologne that the young Captain Montgomery persuaded him to add his name to the list of officers selected for Staff College, which would be his only hope of ever achieving high command. In late June 1919 it briefly appeared that Germany might refuse to sign the Versailles Treaty. Units – consisting largely of young and inexperienced soldiers as war veterans had been given priority for demobilisation – had to be concentrated to advance further into Germany and be prepared for irregular warfare, but the crisis passed.

Robertson was appointed a Knight Grand Cross of the Order of St Michael and St George in the King's Birthday Honours in June 1919. He was not invited to the peace celebration on 19 July 1919. He was thanked by Parliament, granted £10,000 (the same amount as Wilson, Birdwood or Trenchard; the capital was held in trust and only the income made available) and created a Baronet, of Welbourn in the County of Lincolnshire on 29 December 1919.

After the War he was also awarded the Belgian War Cross, the Grand Cross of the Serbian Order of the White Eagle (with Swords) and the American Distinguished Service Medal. This was as well as being appointed to the Chinese Order of Chia-Ho (1st Class), being given the Grand Cross of the Order of the Crown of Italy, being appointed to the Russian Order of Alexander Nevsky and receiving the Japanese Grand Cordon of the Order of the Rising Sun.

Troop reductions meant that the Rhine Command was being downgraded to a lieutenant-general's command, so in July 1919 Churchill offered Robertson the Irish Command, often a last posting for distinguished generals nearing retirement. Although the level of violence in Ireland in 1919 was not yet as high as it would be in 1920–21, there were concerns that Robertson lacked the subtlety for the job. In October the CIGS Henry Wilson warned Churchill that the planned introduction of Irish Home Rule that autumn would lead to unrest, and asked him to consult the Prime Minister, perhaps in the knowledge that Lloyd George disliked Robertson. Lloyd George suggested that Robertson be appointed Commander-in-Chief, India, but this job was already earmarked for Rawlinson. Lloyd George preferred Macready for the Irish job, as he had experience of peacekeeping duties in South Wales and Belfast as well as having served as Commissioner of the Metropolitan Police in London. Churchill again told the Prime Minister in February 1920 that he wanted Robertson, then protested that he had been overruled. He promoted Robertson to field marshal "as a consolation prize" on 29 March 1920,
 making him the only man ever to rise in the British army from private to field marshal. Wilson thought the promotion as "very disgusting".

On returning to the UK, Robertson received no official welcome at Victoria Station and later recorded that "having secured a broken-down taxi I drove to my residence in Eccleston Square; and thereupon joined the long list of unemployed officers on half-pay".

Later life

Robertson was colonel of the 2nd Dragoons (Royal Scots Greys) from 9 March 1916 and colonel of the 3rd/6th Dragoon Guards from 31 December 1925. He became Colonel of the Royal Horse Guards in 1928; this made him Gold Stick and a member of the Royal Household. He was advanced to Knight Grand Cross of the Royal Victorian Order in 1931.

On retirement Robertson's life savings had been a mere £600 (just over £20,000 at 2014 prices). He became chairman of the Brewers' Trustees and a director of British Dyestuffs Corporation as well as President of the British Legion. He became a director of the British Palestine Corporation and of the London General Omnibus Company – forty years later he was still remembered for his efforts on behalf of the men's welfare. Despite having made gifts to members of his family, on his death he left a modest fortune of £49,000 (almost £3,000,000 at 2014 prices).

Although not a pacifist, in his later years Robertson often spoke out against the cost – both financial and human – of war. His interests were fishing, shooting and golf. Early in 1933 he told Edmonds that his chief regret was that he had never had a command in the field. He died from a thrombosis on 12 February 1933, aged 73. Mount Robertson in the Canadian Rockies and Sir William Robertson High School in his birth village, Welbourn, were named after him.

His body was buried at Brookwood Cemetery.

Personality and assessments
Robertson was a man of strong physique and physical presence, admired by the King for his rise from humble origins. He had a prodigious memory and was very quick on the uptake, sometimes interrupting briefings with: "yes, I have got that, get on to the next point". However, although he could be amusing company off duty, as he rose the career ladder his brusque manner, possibly adopted to assert his authority, became more marked, even with superiors. "I've 'eard different" was a favourite retort to politicians who made military suggestions.

Churchill later wrote that Robertson "was an outstanding military personality. His vision as a strategist was not profound … he had no ideas of his own, but a sensible judgement negative in bias" but he also commented that Robertson "had never himself at any time led even a troop in action, and whose war duties involved him in no more risk than many clerks". Hankey wrote that "he knew what he wanted and he nearly always got his own way".

In October 1918 Foch told Derby that Robertson was "a far sounder man than Wilson" with a greater grasp of strategic detail, but less able to keep the British Cabinet on side. Foch had earlier told Spears "Robertson builds small, but he builds solid".

Spears wrote that he was "an overwhelming personality ... very intolerant of  ignorance ... arrogant, aitchless when excited, and flat-footed (both figuratively and physically) ... an ambulating refrigerator ... when speaking of (any minister) he generally closed the sentence by making the gesture of a governess rapping the knuckles of a child fiddling with things on the table ... a great man, probably the best and finest soldier we produced in the war ... his manners were not good ... for the sake of standing by Haig he probably put aside and overrode many ideas of his own ... (in his loyalty to Haig) he was plus royaliste que le roi". His papers were "a monument of common sense and foresight". Spears' secretary was the daughter of Maurice, whom he described as "Man Friday" to "this whale of a man, this soldier shipwrecked on the desert island of politics".

Maurice Hankey recorded that on a prewar committee which he had chaired Robertson, then Director of Military Training, had sat rudely with his back turned to him, until he had flattered him by seeking his advice privately. He wrote that "Perhaps his greatest quality … was "character". His was a dominating personality … (until) he had to give place to a more nimble and versatile mind (i.e. Wilson)".

Lloyd George (Memoirs Vol i. p467) accused Robertson of having "a profound and disturbing suspicion of all foreigners", but this is an exaggeration – with Britain and France allies for only the second time in their history, Robertson had played a leading role in instigating the Chantilly Conference at the end of 1915, and extended his hand to reach agreement with Nivelle in March 1917 and Petain in summer 1917.

Lloyd George's biographer John Grigg is extremely critical of Robertson's behaviour during the Maurice Affair of May 1918. He comments that both Robertson and Maurice had time on their hands following their recent ousting and that men in such circumstances are apt to persuade themselves that great issues of principle are at stake. "In a remarkable, if flawed, career this was the ignoblest episode … Robertson's manipulative conduct [in encouraging Maurice to breach King's Regulations and destroy his own career] stands to his eternal discredit". Grigg believes that Robertson hoped to be reinstated as CIGS. Given Robertson's behaviour, Lloyd George's fears of a military plot to oust him were "not entirely fanciful".

Relations with Haig and other generals
Robertson later wrote that "there was never, so far as I know, any material difference of opinion between (himself and Haig) in regard to the main principles to be observed in order to win the war".

David Woodward argues that, while his partnership with Haig was "arguably the most important partnership in British military history", which helped to ensure a massive British commitment to the Western Front, to some extent Robertson would have preferred more cautious attritional attacks rather than Haig's attempts at achieving deeper territorial objectives and possibly even breakthrough. Lloyd George claimed that Robertson was dominated by Haig, his senior in rank and social position; Woodward does not wholly accept this: although he did discourage Haig's promotion to field marshal while the Somme battle was still underway, in general Robertson simply thought it inappropriate to question Haig's plans while they were being carried out.

Cassar writes that Robertson was "blunt, graceless and prone to emotional outbursts when upset". "One can only speculate why someone as tough-minded and opinionated as Robertson would habitually defer to Haig. The reason, it would seem, was … because he was convinced that any split between the two would be exploited by the politicians to further their own agendas".

Haig's diary does record that Robertson was hard to work with as he was not "a gentleman", and he wrote to his wife (30 May 1917) that he was "tactless" for wanting to come out to France during Messines "all for his own advertisement".

Robertson's rival Wilson appears to have held him in similar social disdain. Early in Robertson's tenure as Commandant at Staff College (20 December 1910), he did not speak to Wilson when he visited Staff College with the CIGS Nicholson, causing his predecessor to complain to Nicholson about his "most rude & unpardonable behaviour". After Robertson had again not spoken to him at a Staff College point-to-point (25 March 1911), Wilson wrote that he was "an ill-mannered swine, though I don't think he means to be rude". Wilson wrote (in 1915) "He is secretive &, like all underbreds, suspicious; also his manners are somewhat repugnant" and that he was "a slippery old boy" and "It is d(amnable?) to work with a man who is not a gentleman. The moment the strain comes so does the hairy heel."

Robertson's lack of social graces was also remarked on by the staff officer Philip Howell (letter to his wife 10 April 1915) and, in 1933, by General "Tavish" Davidson to Spears.

Relations with politicians
Edmonds later argued in the Official History that Robertson had lost his position because of his bluntness and inability to get on with politicians. Woodward rejects this argument, arguing that although the government's failure to agree on clear war aims, other than defeating Germany, made his job much harder, ministers largely supported Robertson's commitment to the Western Front throughout 1916 and 1917, rather than Lloyd George's many schemes, until the manpower situation meant that a winding-down of that commitment was becoming inevitable (although in fact the war would take a different turn in 1918). Robertson himself noted in 1932 that Lloyd George's object (the "firework strategy" as he called it at the time) had been "to avoid fighting Germans" and that his survival as CIGS had often depended on Lloyd George's inability to persuade either the French or his ministerial colleagues to adopt his plans rather than Robertson's.

Much ink has been spilled over Robertson's behaviour over Third Ypres, when he kept from the government both his disagreements with Haig (over the likelihood of territorial gains, Germany's nearness to defeat and the necessity for serious French participation) and, in mid-June, Lt-Col Edward Spears' reports on the extent of the French Mutiny. Terraine, quoting Victor Bonham-Carter, argued that by the second half of 1917 the distrust between Robertson and Lloyd George was such that he felt that, if he did not stand solid with Haig, Lloyd George would lose the war by transferring resources to other fronts. Woodward describes Robertson's behaviour as "indefensible".

Hankey tried to institute weekly breakfasts between Lloyd George and Robertson, but these had failed as Lloyd George liked to sit talking for a long time after breakfast. Although he cultivated a myth that he never read, Lloyd George was in fact a very early riser, who would have already have completed much of the day's paperwork before breakfast, and therefore preferred to do business at breakfast meetings rather than in the evening. Austen Chamberlain found the practice equally irritating.

Family
Late in 1894, after his return from Chitral, he married Mildred Palin, the daughter of Lt-Gen Charles Thomas Palin of the Indian Army, but her family did not approve of the match. Their first child, a son, died in infancy, but they then had two daughters and two more sons. His elder surviving son, Brian Hubert (1896–1974), succeeded to the baronetcy, rose to become a general in the British Army and was raised to the peerage as Baron Robertson of Oakridge in 1961. His younger son John (1909–28) predeceased him, a tragedy which clouded his final years.

Notes

References

Further reading

External links

Sir William Robert Robertson, 1st Bt (1860–1933), Field Marshal (National Portrait Gallery)
William Robertson at The Online Library of Liberty
Outline of career
Life story of Field Marshal Sir William Robertson at Lives of the First World War (Imperial War Museums)

|-

 

|-

1860 births
1933 deaths
People from North Kesteven District
Robertson, William Robert, 1st Baronet
16th The Queen's Lancers soldiers
3rd Carabiniers officers
3rd Dragoon Guards officers
Royal Horse Guards officers
Royal Scots Greys officers
British field marshals
British military personnel of the Chitral Expedition
British Army personnel of the Second Boer War
British Army cavalry generals of World War I
Knights Grand Cross of the Order of St Michael and St George
Knights Grand Cross of the Order of the Bath
Knights Grand Cross of the Royal Victorian Order
Companions of the Distinguished Service Order
Burials at Brookwood Cemetery
English autobiographers
Recipients of the Croix de guerre (Belgium)
Recipients of the Croix de Guerre 1914–1918 (France)
Foreign recipients of the Distinguished Service Medal (United States)
Recipients of the Order of the Rising Sun
Recipients of the Legion of Honour
British autobiographers
Graduates of the Staff College, Camberley
Chiefs of the Imperial General Staff
Military personnel from Lincolnshire
Deaths from thrombosis
Commandants of the Staff College, Camberley
Robertson Baronets, of Beaconsfield
Recipients of the Distinguished Service Medal (US Army)